Hot Springs Municipal Airport  is a city-owned public-use airport located five nautical miles (9 km) southeast of the central business district of Hot Springs, a city in Fall River County, South Dakota, United States.  According to the FAA's National Plan of Integrated Airport Systems for 2009–2013, it is categorized as a general aviation facility.

Although many U.S. airports use the same three-letter location identifier for the FAA and IATA, this facility is assigned HSR by the FAA but has no designation from the IATA.

Facilities and aircraft 
It has two runways: 1/19 is 4,506 by 100 feet (1,373 x 30 m) with an asphalt pavement and 6/24 is 3,946 by 250 feet (1,203 x 76 m) with a turf surface.

For the 12-month period ending June 16, 2009, the airport had 9,000 aircraft operations, an average of 24 per day: 97% general aviation and 3% military. At that time there were 19 aircraft based at this airport: 84% single-engine and 16% glider.

Currently there are 33 aircraft based on the field with 29 single engine airplanes, 1 helicopter and three glider planes.

References

External links 
 Hot Springs (HSR) at South Dakota DOT Airport Directory
 Aerial image as of September 1997 from USGS The National Map
 
 

Airports in South Dakota
Buildings and structures in Fall River County, South Dakota
Transportation in Fall River County, South Dakota